TsRNA can stand for:
Toxic Small RNA
tRNA-derived small RNA